Kraśniczyn  is a village in Krasnystaw County, Lublin Voivodeship, in eastern Poland. It is the seat of the gmina (administrative district) called Gmina Kraśniczyn.

The village has a population of 447.

References

Villages in Krasnystaw County
Kholm Governorate
Lublin Voivodeship (1919–1939)